Les Lions sont lâchés (US title: The Lions Are Loose) is a 1961 French comedy film directed by Henri Verneuil, and written by France Roche and Michel Audiard (dialogue). The music score was by Georges Garvarentz and the cinematography by Christian Matras.

It tells the story of three women living in Paris.

Principal cast
Jean-Claude Brialy as  Didier Marèze 
Claudia Cardinale as  Albertine Ferran 
Danielle Darrieux as  Marie-Laure Robert-Guichard 
Michèle Morgan as  Cécile 
Lino Ventura as  Le docteur André Challenberg 
Denise Provence as  Hélène Challenberg 
Daniel Ceccaldi as Georges Guichard 
Martine Messager as  Florence Guichard
Darry Cowl  as  Richard
Jean Ozenne as Alfred Robert-Guichard
Francis Nani as Arnaud Guichard
François Nocher as Gilles
Louis Arbessier as Frédéric Moine
Bernard Musson as Gabriel, Butler
Charles Aznavour as himself

External links
Les Lions sont lâchés at Alice Cinema

French black-and-white films
1961 films
Films directed by Henri Verneuil
Films with screenplays by Michel Audiard
1960s French films